Fresno is a major city in the San Joaquin Valley of California, United States. It is the county seat of Fresno County and the largest city in the greater Central Valley region. The Metro population of Fresno is  786,000 as of 2022. As of 2023 it’s 795,000.

Named for the abundant ash trees lining the San Joaquin River, Fresno was founded in 1872 as a railway station of the Central Pacific Railroad before it was incorporated in 1885. It has since become an economic hub of Fresno County and the San Joaquin Valley, with much of the surrounding areas in the Metropolitan Fresno region predominantly tied to large-scale agricultural production.

Fresno is also the third-largest majority-Hispanic city in the United States; 50.5% of its population being Hispanic in 2020.

History

The original inhabitants of the San Joaquin Valley region were the Yokuts people and Miwok people, who engaged in trading with other Californian tribes of Native Americans including coastal peoples such as the Chumash of the Central California coast, with whom they are thought to have traded plant and animal products.

The first European to enter the San Joaquin Valley was Pedro Fages in 1772. The county of Fresno was formed in 1856 after the California Gold Rush. It was named for the abundant ash trees (Spanish: fresno) lining the San Joaquin River.

The San Joaquin River flooded on December 24, 1867, inundating Millerton. Some residents rebuilt, others moved. Flooding also destroyed the town of Scottsburg on the nearby Kings River that winter. Rebuilt on higher ground, Scottsburg was renamed Centerville.

In 1867, Anthony Easterby purchased land bounded by the present Chestnut, Belmont, Clovis and California avenues, that today is called the Sunnyside district. Unable to grow wheat for lack of water, he hired sheep man Moses Church in 1871 to create an irrigation system. Building new canals and purchasing existing ditches, Church then formed the Fresno Canal and Irrigation Company, a predecessor of the Fresno Irrigation District.

In 1872, the Central Pacific Railroad established a station near Easterby's—by now a hugely productive wheat farm—for its new Southern Pacific line. Soon there was a store near the station and the store grew into the town of Fresno Station, later called Fresno. At that time, Mariposa street was the main artery, a rough dusty or muddy depression. Many Millerton residents, drawn by the convenience of the railroad and worried about flooding, moved to the new community. Fresno became an incorporated city in 1885. In 1903, the faltering San Joaquin Power Company was renamed the San Joaquin Light and Power Corporation and included the Fresno City Water Company and the Fresno City Railway.

In 1865, William Helm brought his sheep to Fresno county, which was then a vast space of open land. By 1877, Helm made Fresno his home with a five-acre tract of land at the corner of Fresno and R streets. Helm was the largest individual sheep grower in Fresno County.

Two years after the station was established, county residents voted to move the county seat from Millerton to Fresno. When the Friant Dam was completed in 1944, the site of Millerton became inundated by the waters of Millerton Lake. In extreme droughts, when the reservoir shrinks, ruins of the original county seat can still be observed.

In the nineteenth century, with so much wooden construction and in the absence of sophisticated firefighting resources, fires often ravaged American frontier towns. The greatest of Fresno's early-day fires, in 1882, destroyed an entire block of the city. Another devastating blaze struck in 1883.

In 1909, Fresno's first and oldest synagogue, Temple Beth Israel, was founded.

Fresno entered the ranks of the 100 most populous cities in the United States in 1960 with a population of 134,000. Thirty years later, in the 1990 census, it moved up to 47th place with 354,000, and in the census of 2000, it achieved 37th place with 428,000.

The Fresno Municipal Sanitary Landfill was the first modern landfill in the United States, and incorporated several important innovations to waste disposal, including trenching, compacting, and the daily covering of trash with dirt. It was opened in 1937 and closed in 1987. It is a National Historic Landmark as well as a Superfund site.

Before World War II, Fresno had many ethnic neighborhoods, including Little Armenia, German Town, Little Italy, and Chinatown. In 1940, the Census Bureau reported Fresno's population as 94.0% white, 3.3% black and 2.7% Asian. Chinatown was primarily a Japanese neighborhood and today few Japanese-American businesses remain. During 1942, Pinedale, in what is now North Fresno, was the site of the Pinedale Assembly Center, an interim facility for the relocation of Fresno area Japanese Americans to internment camps. The Fresno Fairgrounds were also utilized as an assembly center.

Row crops and orchards gave way to urban development particularly in the period after World War II; this transition was particularly vividly demonstrated in locations such as the Blackstone Avenue corridor.

In September 1958, Bank of America launched a new product called BankAmericard in Fresno. After a troubled gestation during which its creator resigned, BankAmericard went on to become the first successful credit card. This financial instrument was usable across a large number of merchants and also allowed cardholders to revolve a balance (earlier financial products could do one or the other but not both). In 1976, BankAmericard was renamed and spun off into a separate company known today as Visa Inc.

The dance style commonly known as popping evolved in Fresno in the 1970s.

In 1995, the Federal Bureau of Investigation's Operation Rezone sting resulted in several prominent Fresno and Clovis politicians being charged in connection with taking bribes in return for rezoning farmland for housing developments. Before the sting brought a halt to it, housing developers could buy farmland cheaply, pay off council members to have it rezoned, and make a large profit building and selling inexpensive housing. Sixteen people were eventually convicted as a result of the sting.

Geography

Fresno's location, very near the geographical center of California, places the city a comfortable distance from many of the major recreation areas and urban centers in the state. The city is located near several Sierra Nevada lakes including Bass Lake, Shaver Lake, and Huntington Lake. Fresno is also only two and a half hours from Monterey, Carmel, Big Sur and the central coast.

Because Fresno sits at the junction of Highways 41 and 99 (SR 41 is Yosemite National Park's southern access road, and SR 99 bypasses Interstate 5 to serve the urban centers of the San Joaquin Valley), the city is a major gateway for Yosemite visitors coming from Los Angeles. The city also serves as an entrance into Sierra National Forest via Highway 168, and Sequoia and Kings Canyon National Parks via Highway 180.

Fresno has three large public parks, two in the city limits and one in county land to the southwest. Woodward Park, which features the Shinzen Japanese Gardens, boasts numerous picnic areas and several miles of trails. It is in North Fresno and is adjacent to the San Joaquin River Parkway. Roeding Park, near Downtown Fresno, is home to the Fresno Chaffee Zoo, and Rotary Storyland and Playland. Kearney Park is the largest of the Fresno region's park system and is home to historic Kearney Mansion and plays host to the annual Civil War Revisited, the largest reenactment of the Civil War in the west coast of the U.S.

In its 2020 ParkScore ranking, The Trust for Public Land, a national land conservation organization, reported that Fresno had one of the worst park systems among the 50 most populous U.S. cities. The survey measures median park size, park acres as percent of city area, residents' access to parks, spending on parks per resident, and playgrounds per 10,000 residents.

Neighborhoods

Downtown

Fresno was born with the establishment of the then Central Pacific Railroad Depot in 1872. In 1889, the Southern Pacific Railroad, which had acquired Central Pacific, constructed a new depot on the original depot site. The brick Queen Anne style depot was a jewel for the city and is currently one of Fresno's oldest standing buildings. In 1971, 99 years after it first opened for business on its current site, the Depot closed its rail operations due to the decline in business.

Between the 1880s and World War II, Downtown Fresno flourished, filled with electric streetcars, and contained a number of "lavish" and "opulent" buildings. Among them, the original Fresno County Courthouse (demolished), the Fresno Carnegie Public Library (demolished), the Old Fresno Water Tower, the Bank of Italy Building, the Pacific Southwest Building, the San Joaquin Light and Power Building (currently known as the Grand 1401), and the Hughes Hotel (burned down), to name a few.

Fulton Street in Downtown Fresno was Fresno's main financial and commercial district before being converted into one of the nation's first pedestrian malls in 1964. Renamed the Fulton Mall, the area contains the densest collection of historic buildings in Fresno. While the Fulton Mall corridor has suffered a sharp decline from its heyday, the Mall includes some of the finest public art pieces in the country, including a casting of Pierre-Auguste Renoir's bronze "The Washer Woman", reportedly the only one of the six castings that one can walk up to and touch. In October 2017, the City of Fresno finished and opened Fulton Mall to traffic, becoming Fulton Street. This change was celebrated with a large public parade featuring current Mayor Lee Brand and former Mayor Ashley Swearengin. The public art pieces will be restored and placed near their current locations and will feature wide sidewalks (up to 28' on the east side of the street) to continue with the pedestrian-friendly environment of the district.

Tower District

The historic Tower Theatre, which is included on the National Register of Historic Places, is the center of the Tower District. The theater was built in 1939 at the corner of Olive and Wishon Avenues. The Tower District neighborhood is just north of downtown Fresno proper, and one-half mile south of Fresno City College. Although the neighborhood was known as a residential area, the early commercial establishments of the Tower District began with small shops and services that flocked to the area shortly after World War II. The character of small local businesses largely remains today. To some extent, the businesses of the Tower District were developed due to the proximity of the original Fresno Normal School (later renamed California State University at Fresno). In 1916, the college moved to what is now the site of Fresno City College one-half mile north of the Tower District.

After decades of neglect and suburban flight, the neighborhood revival followed the re-opening of the Tower Theatre in the late 1970s, which at that time showed second- and third-run movies, along with classic films. Roger Rocka's Dinner Theater & Good Company Players also opened nearby in 1978, at Olive and Wishon Avenues. Fresno native Audra McDonald performed in the leading roles of Evita and The Wiz at the theater while she was a high school student. McDonald subsequently became a leading performer on Broadway in New York City and a Tony award-winning actress. Also in the Tower District is Good Company Players' 2nd Space Theatre.

The Tower District is a hub for community events such as Jamaica My Weekend, Mardi Gras in February, Gay Pride Parade, car shows, A Taste of The Tower, Halloween in the Tower, and the Farmers' market opened on the northwest Corner of Olive and Van Ness.

The neighborhood features restaurants, live theater and nightclubs, as well as several independent shops and bookstores on or near Olive Avenue. Since renewal, the Tower District has become an attractive area for restaurant and other local businesses. The Tower District is known as the center of Fresno's LGBT and hipster communities.

The area is also known for its early twentieth century homes, many of which have been restored in recent decades. The area includes many California Bungalow and American Craftsman style homes, Spanish Colonial Revival Style architecture, Mediterranean Revival Style architecture, Mission Revival Style architecture, and many Storybook houses designed by Fresno architects, Hilliard, Taylor & Wheeler. The residential architecture of the Tower District contrasts with the newer areas of tract homes urban sprawl in north and east areas of Fresno.

Woodward Park

In the northeastern part of Fresno, Woodward Park was founded by the late Ralph Woodward, a long-time Fresno resident. He bequeathed a major portion of his estate in 1968 to provide a regional park and bird sanctuary in Northeast Fresno. The park lies on the southern bank of the San Joaquin River between Highway 41 and Friant Road. The initial , combined with additional acres acquired later by the city, brings the park to a sizable . Now packed with amenities, Woodward Park is the only Regional Park of its size in the Central Valley. The park has a multi-use amphitheatre that seats up to 2,500 people, an authentic Japanese Garden, fenced dog park, bike park, two playgrounds, two-mile (3 km) equestrian trail, exercise par course, three children's playgrounds, a lake, three small ponds, seven picnic areas, and five miles (8 km) of multipurpose trails that are part of the San Joaquin River Parkway's Lewis S. Eaton Trail. When complete, the Lewis S. Eaton trail system will cover  between Highway 99 and Friant Dam. The park's amphitheatre was renovated in 2010, and has hosted performances by acts such as Deftones, Tech N9ne, and Sevendust as well as numerous others. Woodward Park hosts the annual California Interscholastic Federation State Championship cross country meet. It is the home of the Woodward Shakespeare Festival which began performances in the park in 2005.

Fig Garden
Located in the western portion of Fresno, Old Fig Garden is an unincorporated community that, over time, has been completely encircled by the city of Fresno. Fig Garden was created in 1947, as the then-known Fig Garden Men's club achieved nonprofit corporate status, allowing itself to have much more governance.

In 1979, the name was changed to Fig Garden Home Owners Association. Fig Garden is unique to the rest of Fresno, as it features largely no sidewalks and is lined with various large trees. The homes are well-maintained and landscaped due to strict regulations from the homeowners association. Due to a tax Fig Garden residences voted for, there is nearly round-the-clock sheriff service within the district. The district hosts the Fig Garden Christmas Tree Lane, which is a nationally recognized event. There is also an upscale swim and racquet club located in northwestern Fig garden, which has multiple amenities including a heated lap pool, massage therapy, daycare, etc. Towards the northern boundary there is a shopping center called Fig Garden Village which hosts a plethora of upscale shopping opportunities, as well as hosting the only Whole Foods Market within the Fresno area.

Climate

Fresno has a hot semi-arid climate (BSh in the Köppen climate classification), with cool, wet winters and very long, hot, dry summers. July is the warmest month, averaging ; normally, there are 38 days of + highs and 113 days of + highs, and between July and August, there are only 3.6 days where the high does not reach . Summers provide considerable sunshine, with July exceeding 96 percent of the total possible sunlight hours; conversely, December is the lowest with only 42 percent of the daylight time in sunlight because of tule fog. However, the year averages 81% of possible sunshine, for a total of 3550 hours. Most of the wind rose direction occurrences derive from the northwest, as winds are driven downward along the axis of the California Central Valley; in December, January and February there is an increased presence of southeastern wind directions in the wind rose statistics. Fresno meteorology was selected in a national U.S. Environmental Protection Agency study for analysis of equilibrium temperature for use of ten-year meteorological data to represent a warm, dry western United States locale.

The average windows for temperatures of + are June 2 through September 15; for temperatures of +, April 25 through October 10; and for freezing temperatures, December 14 through January 24, although no freeze occurred during the 1983–84 or 2020–21 winter seasons. Measurable precipitation falls on an average of 46.5 days annually.

Demographics

Fresno is the larger principal city of the Fresno-Madera CSA, a Combined Statistical Area that includes the Fresno (Fresno County) and Madera (Madera County) metropolitan areas, which had a combined population of 922,516 at the 2000 census.

Fresno is home to numerous ethnic minority communities, such as the Armenian and Hmong communities. In 1920, Armenians comprised 9% of the population of the city of Fresno, with 4,000 Armenian residents at the time. Old Armenian Town was the old Armenian neighborhood in the center of Fresno. The Hmong community of Fresno, along with that of Minneapolis–Saint Paul, is one of the largest two urban U.S. ethnic Hmong communities, with just over 24,000 people, or about 5% of the city's population, being of Hmong descent.

2010
The 2010 United States Census reported that Fresno had a population of 494,665. The racial makeup of Fresno was 245,306 (49.6%) White, 40,960 (8.3%) African American, 8,525 (1.7%) Native American, 62,528 (12.6%) Asian (3.6% Hmong, 1.7% Indian, 1.2% Filipino, 1.2% Laotian, 1.0% Thai, 0.8% Cambodian, 0.7% Chinese, 0.5% Japanese, 0.4% Vietnamese, 0.2% Korean), 849 (0.2%) Pacific Islander, 111,984 (22.6%) from other races, and 24,513 (5.0%) from two or more races. Hispanic or Latino of any race were 232,055 persons (46.9%). Among the Hispanic population, 42.7% of the total population are Mexican, 0.4% Salvadoran, and 0.4% Puerto Rican. Non-Hispanic Whites were 30.0% of the population in 2010, down from 72.6% in 1970.

The Census reported that 485,798 people (98.2% of the population) lived in households, 4,315 (0.9%) lived in non-institutionalized group quarters, and 4,552 (0.9%) were institutionalized.

There were 158,349 households, of which 68,511 (43.3%) had children under the age of 18 living in them, 69,284 (43.8%) were opposite-sex married couples living together, 30,547 (19.3%) had a female householder with no husband present, 11,698 (7.4%) had a male householder with no wife present. There were 12,843 (8.1%) unmarried opposite-sex partnerships, and 1,388 (0.9%) same-sex married couples or partnerships. 35,064 households (22.1%) were made up of individuals, and 12,344 (7.8%) had someone living alone who was 65 years of age or older. The average household size was 3.07. There were 111,529 families (70.4% of all households); the average family size was 3.62.

The age distribution of the population shows 148,823 people (30.1%) under the age of 18, 62,601 people (12.7%) aged 18 to 24, 135,076 people (27.3%) aged 25 to 44, 102,064 people (20.6%) aged 45 to 64, and 46,101 people (9.3%) who were 65 years of age or older. The median age was 29.3 years. For every 100 females, there were 96.7 males. For every 100 females age 18 and over, there were 93.5 males.

The homeowner vacancy rate was 2.6%; the rental vacancy rate was 7.6%. 235,430 people (47.6% of the population) lived in owner-occupied housing units and 250,368 people (50.6%) lived in rental housing units.

2000

As of the census of 2000, there were 427,652 people, 140,079 households, and 97,915 families residing in the city. The racial makeup of the city was 50.2% White, 8.4% Black or African American, 1.6% Native American, 11.2% Asian (about a third of which is Hmong), 0.1% Pacific Islander, 23.4% from other races, and 5.2% from two or more races. Hispanic or Latino of any race were 39.9% of the population.

There were 140,079 households, of which 40.4% had children under the age of 18 living with them, 46.1% were married couples living together, 17.6% had a female householder with no husband present, and 30.1% were non-families. 23.3% of all households were made up of individuals, and 7.9% had someone living alone who was 65 years of age or older. The average household size was 2.99 and the average family size was 3.57.

In the city, the age distribution of the population shows 32.9% under the age of 18, 11.8% from 18 to 24, 28.8% from 25 to 44, 17.2% from 45 to 64, and 9.3% who were 65 years of age or older. The median age was 28 years. For every 100 females, there were 96.6 males. For every 100 females age 18 and over, there were 93.0 males.

The median income for a household in the city was $32,236, and the median income for a family was $35,892. Males had a median income of $32,279 versus $26,551 for females. The per capita income for the city was $15,010. About 20.5% of families and 26.2% of the population were below the poverty line, including 36.5% of those under age 18 and 10.7% of those age 65 or over.

Economy

Fresno is the center of Metropolitan Fresno and serves as the regional hub for the San Joaquin Valley and the greater Central Valley region. The unincorporated area and rural cities surrounding Fresno remain predominantly tied to large-scale agricultural production.

In 1958, Fresno was selected by Bank of America to first launch the BankAmericard credit card, which was later renamed Visa.

Companies based in Fresno include Pelco, Valley Yellow Pages, and Saladino's.

Top employers 
According to the city's 2020 Comprehensive Annual Financial Report, the top employers in the city are:

Arts and culture

Performing arts and music
Artists' Repertory Theatre
Children's Musical Theatreworks
Center State Productions
Fresno Philharmonic
Philip Lorenz International Keyboard Concerts
Roger Rocka's Dinner Theater & 2nd Space Theatre (Good Company Players)
Rogue Festival
Shine! Theatre
Stageworks of Fresno
Woodward Shakespeare Festival
Youth Orchestras of Fresno

Theaters 

 Azteca Theater 
 Crest Theatre
 Liberty Theatre
 Tower Theatre – Tower Theatre for the Performing Arts
 Warnors Theatre – Warnor's Center for the Performing Arts
 Wilson Theatre – currently Cornerstone Church
 Veteran's Memorial Auditorium
 Paul Shaghoian Memorial Concert Hall - Clovis North High School

Museums

African-American Museum of the San Joaquin Valley
Arte Américas
Armenian Museum of Fresno
Discovery Center
William Saroyan House Museum
Forestiere Underground Gardens
Fresno Art Museum
Kearney Mansion Museum
Legion of Valor Museum
Meux Home Museum
Old Fresno Water Tower Tourist Center
Fresno Chaffee Zoo
Sierra Endangered Cat Haven (Fresno County)

Events

Ani-Me Con (every spring) Fresno's only anime convention.
Armenian Grape Blessing (August)
ArtHop (first Thursday of every month) 
The Big Fresno Fair, 12 days October, the largest event in the Central Valley attracting over 600,000 visitors
Taco Truck Throwdown
Christmas Tree Lane Every December
Fresno LGBT Pride Parade, every June, first held in 1991
Grizzly Fest April/May 
Valley DevFest (Fall) 
Vintage Days March or April
Greek Fest three days every September

Sports

Fresno has no teams in any of the five major sports leagues. However, collegiate sports are very popular. Fresno State Bulldogs football program is considered to be the biggest event in terms of sporting events in the city. The term "Red Wave" is the name given to the fans of Fresno State athletics, and as well as "Pride of the Valley" since the university's fanbase represents all of Fresno and California's San Joaquin Valley. 
Below are Fresno-based professional sports teams:

 The Save Mart Center at Fresno State is a multi-purpose arena on the campus of the California State University, Fresno. It is home to the Fresno State Bulldogs basketball team and, for the first five seasons in the ECHL (2003–08) hosted the Fresno Falcons ice hockey team. It also hosts a wide range of musical acts and other events.
 Also on the campus of Fresno State is Valley Children's Stadium, a 41,031-seat football stadium. It is home to the Fresno State Bulldogs football program.
 Next to Bulldog Stadium is Pete Beiden Field. It is home to the Fresno State Bulldogs baseball program and was home to the Fresno Grizzlies before their move to Chukchansi Park in Downtown Fresno.
 Fresno's Woodward Park is the location of the CIF Cross Country State Championships, where high schoolers from around the state compete. Additionally the BMX course in the park plays host to the National Bicycle League State Championships.
 Ratcliffe Stadium, on the campus of Fresno City College, is a 13,000-seat track and field stadium. The stadium played host to the West Coast Relays. It is home to the college's football program and is also host to high school football games and track and field events.
 The Fresno Yacht Club established in 1959 hosts the High Sierra Regatta on Huntington Lake every July (barring extreme drought) and regular sailing on Millerton Lake.

Government

Fresno has a strong-mayor form of government. The mayor (executive branch) is directly elected and the seven city council members (legislative branch) are elected by district with no “at-large” seats. The mayor and council members are elected for no more than two 4-year terms. The mayor’s office and council positions are officially nonpartisan and not affiliated with any political party.

Mayor

 1901–1905 L. O. Stephens
 1905–1908 W. Parker Lyon
 1908–1909 Ed E. Bush (acting)
 1909–1912 Chester Rowell †
 1912–1917 Alva E. Snow
 1917–1921 William F. Toomey
 1921–1925 Truman C. Hart
 1925–1929 A. E. Sunderland
 1929–1937 Z. S. Leymel
 1937–1941 Frank A. Homan
 1941–1947 Z. S. Leymel †
 1947–1947 Glenn M. DeVore (acting)
 1949–1957 Gordon Dunn
 1957–1958 C. Cal Evans
 1958–1963 Arthur L. Selland †
 1963–1965 Wallace Henderson (acting)
 1965–1969 Floyd H. Hyde
 1969–1977 Ted C. Wills
 1977–1985 Dan Whitehurst
 1985–1989 Dale Doig
 1989–1993 Karen Humphrey
 1993–2001 Jim Patterson
 2001–2009 Alan Autry
 2009–2017 Ashley Swearengin
 2017–2021 Lee Brand
 2021– Jerry Dyer

City Council

 District 1 - Esmeralda Soria
 District 2 - Mike Karbassi
 District 3 - Miguel Arias
 District 4 - Tyler Maxwell
 District 5 - Luis Chavez
 District 6 - Garry Bredefeld
 District 7 - Nelson Esparza

Prior to 1901, Fresno's government was under a ward system which allowed for a board of trustees. From the trustees elected by the city wards, a President of the Board of Trustees would act as ex-officio mayor however did not hold the title of mayor. Because of this, the President of the Board of Trustees is not recognized as mayors of the City of Fresno.

Courts

Fresno is the county seat of Fresno County. It maintains the main county courthouse on Van Ness in the Fresno County Plaza for criminal and some civil court cases.

The United States District Court, Eastern District of California, has one of its six divisions based in the Robert E. Coyle Courthouse. The new courthouse replaced the B.F. Sisk Federal Building in 2006 because it did not have enough space for the growing Fresno Division. After extensive renovation, the building reopened in November 2010 as the B.F. Sisk Courthouse serving the Fresno County Superior Court.

Fresno is also the seat of the Fifth Appellate District of the State of California Court of Appeal where a new courthouse was built in the old Armenian Town section of downtown Fresno in 2007 across from the Fresno Convention Center. The Fifth District Court of Appeal Courthouse is named after former State Senator and Associate Justice of the Fifth District, George N. Zenovich.

Politics

, according to Fresno County Registrar of Voters, the majority of registered voters in both the city and county of Fresno are registered to the Democratic Party. According to the county registrar's official final reportU.S. President Barack Obama carried the county 49.99% in the 2008 United States presidential election.

State and federal representation

The citizens of Fresno are represented in the United States House of Representatives by Representative Jim Costa, Democrat, in District 21, and Kevin McCarthy, Republican, in District 20.

Education

Four-year institutions
California State University, Fresno is the main state school in Fresno though the University of California, Merced has its Fresno Center and the University of California, San Francisco has its Fresno Medical Education Program.

Private institutions include
Alliant International University (For Profit)
California Christian College (Private/Freewill Baptist)
Fresno Pacific University (Private/Mennonite Brethren)
Fresno Pacific University Biblical Seminary
Kaplan College, Fresno campus (formerly Maric College)
National University, Fresno campus
University of Phoenix (Private) (For Profit)
DeVry University (Private) (For Profit, Career)

Two-year institutions
Public community colleges include Fresno City College and Clovis Community College.

Career colleges
University of Phoenix
DeVry University
Institute of Technology
San Joaquin Valley College
UEI College

Public K-12 schools

Most of Fresno is in the Fresno Unified School District though small portions are served by the Clovis Unified School District, Central Unified School District, Washington Union Unified School District, Orange Center Elementary School District, Sanger Unified School District and West Park Elementary School District.

Private K-12 schools
Fresno Christian High School (Evangelical Christian)
San Joaquin Memorial High School (Roman Catholic)
Fresno Adventist Academy (Seventh Day Adventist)

Media

Newspapers

The Business Journal
The Fresno Bee

Radio
KMJ, AM 580, 50,000-watt and FM 105.9, is Fresno's first radio station; it began broadcasting in 1922. Its powerful 50,000-watt signal can clearly be heard throughout much of California.
KYNO AM 940, 50,000-watt oldies station
KFIG AM 1430, 5,000-watt ESPN affiliate 
88.1 KFCF is Fresno's Pacifica station, and one of Fresno's few non-commercial, non-corporate radio stations.
89.3 KVPR, provides National Public Radio Programming & classical music throughout the Central California region.
90.7 KFSR is another non-commercial, non-corporate station that plays a full spectrum format, including Jazz, eclectic, Armenian, and others.  Based on the CSUF campus.
94.9 KBOS-FM More commonly known as B95 – Fresno's Hip-Hop Station

Television
To avoid interference with existing VHF television stations in the San Francisco Bay Area and those planned for Chico, Sacramento, Salinas, and Stockton, the Federal Communications Commission decided that Fresno would be a UHF island (only have UHF television stations). 

The very first Fresno television station to begin broadcasting was KMJ-TV, which debuted on June 1, 1953. KMJ-TV is now known as NBC affiliate KSEE.  Other Fresno stations include ABC O&O KFSN-TV, CBS affiliate KGPE, The CW affiliate KFRE-TV, FOX affiliate KMPH-TV, MNTV affiliate KMSG-LD, PBS affiliate KVPT, Telemundo O&O KNSO, Univision O&O KFTV-DT, and Estrella TV affiliate KGMC.

In partnership with the City of Clovis, the City of Fresno opened the Community Media Access Collaborative (CMAC) in April 2012, a public, education and government access television station.

Infrastructure
Since 2010, statewide droughts in California have strained both Fresno's and the entire Central Valley's water security. The city uses surface water from Millerton Lake and Pine Flat Reservoir to supply a pair of water treatment plants.

Transportation

Highways

Fresno is served by State Route 99, the main north–south freeway that connects the major population centers of California’s Central Valley. State Route 168, the Sierra Freeway, heads east to the city of Clovis and Huntington Lake. State Route 41 (Yosemite Freeway/Eisenhower Freeway) comes into Fresno from Atascadero in the south, and then heads north to Yosemite National Park. State Route 180 (Kings Canyon Freeway) comes from the west via Mendota, and then east through the city of Reedley to Kings Canyon National Park.

Fresno is the largest U.S. city not directly linked to an Interstate highway. When the Interstate Highway System was created in the 1950s, the decision was made to build what is now Interstate 5 on the west side of the Central Valley, and thus bypass many of the population centers in the region, instead of upgrading what is now State Route 99. Due to rapidly rising population and traffic in cities along SR 99, as well as the desirability of Federal funding, much discussion has been made to upgrade it to interstate standards and eventually incorporate it into the interstate system, most likely as Interstate 7 or 9. Major improvements to signage, lane width, median separation, vertical clearance, and other concerns are currently underway.

Bus services 

Fresno Area Express (FAX) is the city's primary public transit system, which operates eighteen routes and Handy Ride, a paratransit operation. FAX introduced a frequent bus service called FAX15 in January 2017 with buses operating every 15 minutes on Cedar and Shaw Avenues. The FAX Q line, which the agency brands as bus rapid transit, was introduced in February 2018 and offers service as often as every 10 minutes on Blackstone Avenue, Ventura Avenue and Kings Canyon Road.

As the county seat and the largest city in the region, Fresno also sees service from neighboring regional bus services including Clovis Transit, Fresno County Rural Transit Agency, Kings Area Regional Transit, and Visalia Transit's V-LINE. Intercity and long-distance bus services are provided by Greyhound.

The Yosemite Area Regional Transportation System added summer seasonal service between Fresno and Yosemite National Park in May 2015. 

The city once provided trolley service during the late 19th and early 20th century. Known as the Fresno City Railway Company and later the Fresno Traction Company, the service operated horse-drawn streetcars from 1887 to 1901. Electric streetcars were introduced in 1903. The electric streetcars were used until 1939.

Airports 

Fresno Yosemite International Airport (airport code: FAT), formerly known as Fresno Air Terminal, provides regularly scheduled commercial airline service. The airport serves an estimated 1.3 million passengers annually.

Built in the 1920s by the Works Projects Administration, it is one of the oldest operational airports in California. The airport currently serves as a general aviation airport.

Sierra Sky Park Airport (airport code: E79) in Northwest Fresno is a privately owned airport, but is open to the public. Extra-wide streets surrounding the airport allow for residents of the community to land, taxi down the extra-wide streets, and park their aircraft in a garage at their home. Sierra Sky Park is recognized as the first residential aviation community in the world.

Rail 

Passenger rail service is provided by Amtrak San Joaquins. The main passenger rail station is the renovated historic Santa Fe Railroad Depot in Downtown Fresno. The city of Fresno is planned to be served by the future California High-Speed Rail.

Freight rail service is provided by both the BNSF Railway and the Union Pacific Railroad, which both operate Bakersfield-Stockton mainlines which cross in Fresno, and both railroads maintain railyards within the city. The shortline San Joaquin Valley Railroad also operates former Southern Pacific branch lines heading west and south out of the city.

In popular culture
In the 1970s, the city was the subject of a song, "Walking Into Fresno", written by Hall Of Fame guitarist Bill Aken and recorded by Bob Gallion of the "WWVA Jamboree" radio and television show in Wheeling, West Virginia. Aken also made his first TV appearance playing guitar on the old country-western show at The Fresno Barn.

Fictional residents of the town were portrayed in a 1986 comedic miniseries titled "Fresno", featuring Carol Burnett, Dabney Coleman, Teri Garr and Charles Grodin, along with numerous other celebrities. The mini series was presented as a parody of the prime time soap operas popular in the 1980s.

Notable people

Twin towns – sister cities
Fresno's sister cities are:

 Guadalajara, Mexico
 Kōchi, Japan (1965)
 Münster, Germany (1984)
 Morogoro, Tanzania (1992)
 Verona, Italy (2000, friendship not sister)
 Vagharshapat (also known as Etchmiadzin), Armenia (2009)
 Châteauroux, France (2016)
 Taishan, China
 Afula-Gilboa, Israel
 Taraz (formerly known as Djambul; relationship currently inactive), Kazakhstan
 Torreon, Mexico

See also

 Environmental issues in Fresno, California
 Fresno County Public Library
 Fresno Police Department
 2017 Fresno shootings
 2019 Fresno shooting
 List of Mexican-American communities
 List of U.S. cities with large Hispanic populations
 USS Fresno, 3 ships

Notes

References

Bibliography

External links

 
1872 establishments in California
1885 establishments in California
Armenian diaspora communities in the United States
Cities in Fresno County, California
County seats in California
Incorporated cities and towns in California
Populated places established in 1872
Populated places established in 1885
San Joaquin Valley
Railway towns in California
Chicano and Mexican neighborhoods in California